Lone Rock is a village in Richland County, Wisconsin, United States. The population was 888 at the 2010 census.  The village is named after a sandstone outcrop.

History 
According to a sign near the site, "The Lone Rock - At one time a massive piece of sandstone stood a short distance from the north bank of the Wisconsin River. The rock became a landmark for early river raftsmen and was known as 'Lone Rock' from which the town took its name.  The rock was cut and used for basements and foundations in the village. What is left of the rock is located west of Highway 130 across from Brace Park."

The community was founded in 1856 and incorporated as a village in 1866.  Among its best-known residents is Bertha E. Reynolds, or "Dr. Bertha," the physician who served the community in the early twentieth century. A park and street in Lone Rock honor Reynolds.

Geography

Lone Rock is located at  (43.184165, -90.198384).

The community is on the north side of the Wisconsin River on US Route 14 at the junction of State Highway 130.

Demographics

2010 census
As of the census of 2010, there were 888 people, 370 households, and 244 families living in the village. The racial makeup of the village was 96.8% White, 0.3% African American, 0.6% Native American, 0.5% Asian, 0.5% from other races, and 1.4% from two or more races. Hispanic or Latino of any race were 1.9% of the population.

There were 370 households, of which 33.0% had children under the age of 18 living with them, 42.4% were married couples living together, 15.9% had a female householder with no husband present, 7.6% had a male householder with no wife present, and 34.1% were non-families. 28.6% of all households were made up of individuals, and 10.8% had someone living alone who was 65 years of age or older. The average household size was 2.40 and the average family size was 2.87.

The median age in the village was 37 years. 26.4% of residents were under the age of 18; 9.4% were between the ages of 18 and 24; 25.3% were from 25 to 44; 25.2% were from 45 to 64; and 13.6% were 65 years of age or older. The gender makeup of the village was 52.4% male and 47.6% female.

2000 census
As of the census of 2000, there were 929 people, 393 households, and 240 families living in the village. The population density was 790.2 people per square mile (304.0/km2). There were 425 housing units at an average density of 361.5 per square mile (139.1/km2). The racial makeup of the village was 98.17% White, 0.22% African American, 0.11% Native American, 0.11% Asian, 0.54% from other races, and 0.86% from two or more races. Hispanic or Latino of any race were 1.51% of the population.

There were 393 households, out of which 33.8% had children under the age of 18 living with them, 46.1% were married couples living together, 12.0% had a female householder with no husband present, and 38.7% were non-families. 30.3% of all households were made up of individuals, and 11.7% had someone living alone who was 65 years of age or older. The average household size was 2.36 and the average family size was 2.95.

In the village, the population was spread out, with 27.7% under the age of 18, 8.4% from 18 to 24, 33.0% from 25 to 44, 20.2% from 45 to 64, and 10.7% who were 65 years of age or older. The median age was 34 years. For every 100 females, there were 93.1 males. For every 100 females age 18 and over, there were 87.2 males.

The median income for a household in the village was $33,060, and the median income for a family was $37,750. Males had a median income of $29,844 versus $21,023 for females. The per capita income for the village was $15,985. About 4.1% of families and 5.4% of the population were below the poverty line, including 4.1% of those under age 18 and 7.5% of those age 65 or over.

Transportation
Tri-County Regional Airport (KLNR) serves the city and surrounding communities.

References

External links
 Lone Rock, Wisconsin

Populated places established in 1856
Villages in Richland County, Wisconsin
Villages in Wisconsin